Hezekiah Ndahani Chibulunje (born 15 March 1946) is a Tanzanian CCM politician and Member of Parliament for Chilonwa constituency since 1995.

References

1946 births
Living people
Chama Cha Mapinduzi MPs
Tanzanian MPs 1995–2000
Tanzanian MPs 2000–2005
Tanzanian MPs 2005–2010
Tanzanian MPs 2010–2015
Alliance Secondary School alumni